Storm Mountain is on West Falkland in the Falkland Islands. Because of its location on a narrow peninsula jutting out into the South Atlantic, between Byron Sound and King George Bay, it is highly exposed, whence its name.

References

 Strange, Ian The Falkland Islands

External links
 satellite imagery
 updated weather data of Mount Storm

Mountains of West Falkland